Jackie Christiansen (born 5 March 1977) is a Paralympic athlete from Denmark. When he was 17, he broke his leg during a football game. Because of a medical error, he developed gangrene, and his left leg was amputated below the knee. He competes in throwing events in the F44 classification.

Christiansen has competed in four Paralympics starting in 2000 in Sydney, Australia where he finished sixth in the shot put for F44 athletes.  He later improved on this, winning gold in 2004 in the F44/46 class and in 2008 in the F44 class.  He also won two silver medals in the discus, in the F44/46 class in 2004 and the F44 class in 2008. He won the F42/44 shot put gold medal at the 2012 Summer Paralympics in London.

Jackie Christiansen holds the world shot put record in the F44 class with  set 21 August 2011 in Olomouc, Czech Republic.

He was trained by E.G. Gregersen and from 2011 by Simon Stewart, and is a graduate orthopedist.

In February 2016, Christiansen announced the end of his active sports career as his shot put disability class wasn't on the programme for the Paralympic Games in Rio 2016.

References

External links
 
 Jackie, Tony Christiansen - Team Ossur 
 Statletik.dk - Profile Jackie Christiansen (in Danish)
 Keep Living Award 2006 - Pressalit Group A / S (in Danish)
 Talent for the shot of Dorothy Christiansen - Disability Sport Knowledge 
 Jackie Tony Christiansen - Danish Disabled Sports Federation (in Danish)
 Paralympics Denmark: Jackie Tony Christiansen (in Danish)

1977 births
Living people
Paralympic athletes of Denmark
Danish male discus throwers
Danish male shot putters
Athletes (track and field) at the 2000 Summer Paralympics
Athletes (track and field) at the 2004 Summer Paralympics
Athletes (track and field) at the 2008 Summer Paralympics
Athletes (track and field) at the 2012 Summer Paralympics
Paralympic gold medalists for Denmark
Paralympic silver medalists for Denmark
World record holders in Paralympic athletics
Medalists at the 2004 Summer Paralympics
Medalists at the 2008 Summer Paralympics
Medalists at the 2012 Summer Paralympics
Paralympic medalists in athletics (track and field)
Shot putters with limb difference
Discus throwers with limb difference
Paralympic shot putters
Paralympic discus throwers